Road to Survival is a 1948 book by William Vogt.  It was a major inspiration for a certain strand of modern environmentalism as well as for the revival of Malthusianism - the so-called neo-Malthusianism - in the post-war era.

Summary

Road to Survival is a summary of the ecological status of the world. Vogt documented the negative effects of an expanding global population on the environment. He gathered reports of deforestation, gullying, overgrazing, soil erosion and many forms of destruction of fundamental resources which he believed had arisen from the greed and ignorance of mankind.

Vogt argued that since food production cannot keep pace with the increase in world population, the only solution is universal birth control. Vogt attacks capitalism, and describes United States history as a "march of destruction".

The book is filled with scientific data, and its world-wide scope was unusual at the time.  Ultimately, the book advocates population control as the only way to prevent environmental disaster.  Human population could not exceed the planet's carrying capacity without disaster. According to Hampshire College’s Betsy Hartmann, Vogt is the founder of what she calls "apocalyptic environmentalism".

Reception

The book was commercially successful.  A condensed version was published in Reader's Digest, and many universities used the book as a textbook.  However, his message was attacked by ideologues of all varieties, by conservatives for opposing capitalism and supporting birth control, and by liberals as proof of "science's bankruptcy in the face of pressing modern problems".

A 1949 review in the Geography journal concluded that "the survey of the causes and consequences of soil erosion in the several regions
of the world is a valuable one and although many will quarrel with the author's political and ethical views the thesis presents a challenge that will be a great stimulus to thinking about some of the big issues presented."

Later on, the book would inspire the modern environmental movement, with both Rachel Carson and Paul Ehrlich being inspired by it.

See also
 Our Plundered Planet

References

Environmental non-fiction books
1948 non-fiction books
1948 in the environment